The St George's, Hanover Square by-election of 1906 was held on 15 June 1906.  The by-election was held due to the resignation of the incumbent Conservative MP, Heneage Legge.  It was won by the Liberal Unionist candidate Alfred Lyttelton, who was elected unopposed.

References

St George's, Hanover Square by-election
St George's, Hanover Square by-election
St George's, Hanover Square by-election
St George's, Hanover Square,1906
1900s in the City of Westminster
St George's, Hanover Square,1906
Unopposed by-elections to the Parliament of the United Kingdom in English constituencies